John Finley Oglevee (May 17, 1840 - April 25, 1903) was a Republican politician in the U.S. State of Ohio who was a member of the Ohio House of Representatives for four years and Ohio State Auditor for four years. He was also a Union Army soldier in the American Civil War.

John F. Oglevee was born in Harrison County, Ohio near Cadiz. He lived on a farm, and attended public schools and Franklin College in New Athens, Ohio. On August 6, 1862, he enlisted in Company C of the 98th Ohio Infantry. At the Battle of Chickamauga, he was severely wounded and promoted to second lieutenant for gallantry. He was promoted to first lieutenant September 26, 1864. During the Atlanta Campaign he commanded his company, and was promoted to adjutant of the regiment. He mustered out May 1865.

He moved to Springfield, Ohio, in 1866 and studied law. He enrolled in the University of Michigan Law School in October 1866, and was admitted to the bar in December 1867. In October 1871, he was elected Auditor of Clark County, Ohio, and re-elected in 1873. In 1875 and again in 1877, he was elected to represent the county in the Ohio House of Representatives for the 62nd and 63rd General Assemblies, (1876–1879).

In 1879, he was nominated by the Republicans for Ohio State Auditor, and defeated Democrat Charles Reemelin in the autumn for a four-year term. He was again nominated in 1883, but lost to Democrat Emil Kiesewetter. He then engaged in private business in Columbus.

Oglevee died April 25, 1903, and is interred in Green Lawn Cemetery, Columbus, Ohio.

Notes

References

Ohio lawyers
Ohio Republicans
People from Cadiz, Ohio
Politicians from Springfield, Ohio
University of Michigan Law School alumni
Franklin College (New Athens, Ohio)
1840 births
1903 deaths
People of Ohio in the American Civil War
State Auditors of Ohio
Union Army officers
Burials at Green Lawn Cemetery (Columbus, Ohio)